Alfred Mosher Butts (April 13, 1899 – April 4, 1993) was an American architect, famous for inventing the board game Scrabble in 1938.

Personal life
Alfred Mosher Butts was born in Poughkeepsie, New York, on April 13, 1899, to Allison Butts and Arrie Elizabeth Mosher. His father was a lawyer, and his mother a high school teacher. Alfred attended Poughkeepsie High School and graduated in 1917. He then graduated from the University of Pennsylvania with a degree in architecture in 1924.

He was also an amateur artist, and six of his drawings were acquired by the Metropolitan Museum of Art.

He died on April 4, 1993, nine days before his 94th birthday.

Scrabble
In the early 1930s, after working as an architect but now unemployed, Butts set out to design a board game. He studied existing games and found that games fell into three categories: number games, such as dice and bingo; move games, such as chess and checkers; and word games, such as anagrams. Butts was a resident of Jackson Heights, New York, and the game of Scrabble was invented there. To memorialize his importance to the invention of the game, a street sign at 35th Avenue and 81st Street in Jackson Heights is stylized using letters with their values in Scrabble as a subscript.

Butts decided to create a game that utilized both chance and skill by combining elements of anagrams and crossword puzzles, a popular pastime of the 1920s. Players draw seven lettered tiles from a pool and then attempt to form words from their letters. A key to the game was Butts's analysis of the English language. Butts studied the front page of The New York Times to calculate how frequently each letter of the alphabet was used. He then used each letter's frequency to determine how many of each letter he would include in the game. He included only four "S" tiles so that the ability to make words plural would not make the game too easy.

Butts initially called the game Lexiko, but later changed the name to Criss Cross Words after considering It, and began to seek a buyer. The game makers he originally contacted rejected the idea, but Butts was tenacious. Eventually, he sold the rights to entrepreneur and game lover James Brunot, who made a few minor adjustments to the design and renamed the game Scrabble.

In 1948, the game was trademarked, and Brunot and his wife converted an abandoned schoolhouse in Dodgingtown, Connecticut, into a Scrabble factory. In 1949, the Brunots made 2,400 sets and lost $450 ($5,612 in 2022 terms). But the game was steadily gaining popularity, helped by orders from Macy's department store. By 1952, the Brunots could no longer keep up with demand and asked licensed game maker Selchow and Righter to market and distribute the game. One hundred and fifty million sets have been sold worldwide and between one and two million sets are sold each year in North America alone.

Alfreds Other Game 

Butts later invented another game titled simply  Other Game. Published in 1985 by Selchow and Righter, it never achieved the commercial success of Scrabble.

References

External links
Picture of Alfred Mosher Butts

1899 births
1993 deaths
Board game designers
People from Jackson Heights, Queens
20th-century American architects
Architects from New York City
People from Poughkeepsie, New York
Scrabble